Abercromby ward was an electoral division of Liverpool City Council. It was originally created in 1835, was merged with St James ward in 1974 and was resurrected in 1980. Finally it was divided into the new Riverside and Princes Park wards in 2004.

Councillors

1980 to 2004

1953 to 1972

Election results

Elections of the 2000s

2003

2002

2000

Elections of the 1990s

1999

1998

1996

1995

1994

1992

1991

1990

Elections of the 1980s

1988

1987

1986

1984

1983

1982

1980

For elections between 1973 and 1979 see Abercromby St James

Elections of the 1970s

1972

1971

1970

Elections of the 1960s

1969

1968

1967

1966

1965

1964

1963

1962

1961

1960

Elections of the 1950s

1959

1958

1957

1956

1955

1954

1953
Cllr Thomas George Dominic Maguire died on 24 August 1953.

The 1953 Municipal elections followed boundary changes resulting in all seats being contested.

1952

1951

1950

Elections of the 1940s

1949

1947

1946

1945

References

Wards of Liverpool